Enflo may refer to:

 Per Enflo, Swedish mathematician and pianist, University Professor at Kent State University.  
 Enflo wind turbine, a type of Compact wind acceleration turbine